The Baptist Peace Fellowship of North America-Bautistas por la Paz (BPFNA-Bautistas por la Paz) is a Baptist Christian denomination. The headquarters is in Charlotte, North Carolina.

History
The Convention has its origins in the establishment of the Baptist Pacifist Fellowship by a group of the American Baptist Churches USA in 1939.  It was officially founded in 1984. 
According to a denomination census released in 2020, it claimed 77 churches. 

Most members of BPFNA-Bautistas por la Paz are located in one of the four member nations of the organization (Canada, Mexico, Puerto Rico and the United States) however anyone around the world committed to the work of peace and justice can join. The BPFNA-Bautistas por la Paz membership is composed of individuals and organizations with the latter being mostly churches. Some churches choose to get involved at a deeper level and are considered to be partner congregations of the organization. 

BPFNA-Bautistas por la Paz is a faith-based partner of Equal Exchange through the Baptist Fair Trade Project.

Beliefs
It seeks to gather, equip and mobilize peacemakers of faith across North America and beyond to engage in the work of peace rooted in justice. BPFNA-Bautistas por la Paz provides resources and tools on a variety of social justice issues such as racial justice, justice for migrants and refugees, climate/environmental justice, justice for indigenous and native peoples and LGBTQ+ liberation to name a few. The organization also has several small grant programs to help fund local and global peacemaking initiatives.

Baptist Peacemaker

Baptist Peacemaker is a quarterly publication by BPFNA-Bautistas por la Paz focusing on the work of peacemakers in the BPFNA-Bautistas por la Paz network.

Annual Summer Conference

BPFNA-Bautistas por la Paz holds a Summer Conference (also known affectionately as "Peace Camp") each year. Each gathering focuses on a different theme and changes location within the BPFNA-Bautistas por la Paz member nations, usually held on a university campus. In 2019, however, the Summer Conference was held in conjunction with the 6th Global Baptist Peace Conference in Cali, Colombia.

References

External links
BPFNA-Bautistas por la Paz website (English/inglés)
BPFNA-Bautistas por la Paz website (español/Spanish)

Baptist denominations in North America
Organizations based in Charlotte, North Carolina
Christian organizations established in 1984
Baptist denominations established in the 20th century
Human rights organizations based in the United States
LGBT organizations in the United States
1984 establishments in the United States